is a city located in Niigata Prefecture, Japan. , the city had an estimated population of 28,728 in 19,823 households, and a population density of 86.3 persons per km². Tōkamachi derives its name from the fact that a market was held  every tenth day of the month. Similarly, the nearby former town of Muikamachi had its own local market held on days ending in six each month.

Geography
Tōkamachi is located in an inland region of southwest Niigata Prefecture. Parts of the city are within the borders of the Jōshin'etsu-kōgen National Park.

Surrounding municipalities
Niigata Prefecture
Nagaoka
Jōetsu
Kashiwazaki
Ojiya
Uonuma
Minamiuonuma
Tsunan
 Yuzawa
Nagano Prefecture
 Sakae

Climate
Tōkamachi has a Humid continental climate (Köppen Dfa) characterized by warm, wet summers and cold winters with heavy snowfall. Because Tōkamachi lies in a valley, wind patterns bring in clouds from both the Sea of Japan as well as the Pacific Ocean. The mountains surrounding the city (though not terribly high in altitude) act as any other mountains that affect rain and snow patterns providing a barrier for cloud patterns. This causes a great deal of the built up precipitation to drop on the city. The Tōkamachi area receives the most snow of any area on the main island of Honshu.

Demographics
Per Japanese census data, the population of Tōkamachi has declined steadily over the past 50 years.

History
The area of present-day Tōkamachi was part of ancient Echigo Province, and was part of the tenryō territories held directly by then Tokugawa shogunate. Following the Meiji restoration, was the capital of the newly-formed Nakauonuma District of Niigata Prefecture, and was proclaimed a village on April 1, 1889 with the creation of the modern municipalities system. It was raised to town status on September 24, 1897. Tōkamachi gained city status on March 31, 1954, by merging with the neighbouring villages of Nakajō, Kawaji and Rokka. The village of Yoshida (from Nakauonuma District) was annexed on December 1, 1954 followed by the village of Shimojō (from Nakauonuma District) on February 1, 1955. On April 1, 1962 - Tōkamachi absorbed the village of Mizusawa (from Nakauonuma District). The Chūetsu earthquake of October 23, 2004 caused only minor damage to the city. On April 1, 2005 Tōkamachi absorbed the towns of Matsudai and Matsunoyama (both from Higashikubiki District); the town of Kawanishi, and the village of Nakasato (both from Nakauonuma District) to create the new and expanded city of Tōkamachi.

Government

Tōkamachi has a mayor-council form of government with a directly elected mayor and a unicameral city legislature of 24 members. The city contributes two members to the Niigata Prefectural Assembly. In terms of national politics, the city is part of Niigata District No.6 of the lower house of the National Diet of Japan.

Economy
Sericulture and the production of silk is a traditional mainstay of the local economy. Agriculture, notably the production of Koshihikari rice is also very important.

Education
Tōkamachi has 18 public elementary schools and nine public middle schools operated by the city government and one private elementary and one private middle school. There are four public high schools operated by the Niigata Prefectural Board of Education. The prefectural also operates  three special education schools.

Transportation

Railway
 JR East -  – Iiyama Line
  -  -  -  -  - 
 Hokuetsu Express Hokuhoku Line
 -  -  -

Highway

Sister cities

International
 Como, Italy, signed in 1975

Inside Japan
Sapporo, Hokkaido
Yokohama, Kanagawa
Shibushi, Kagoshima
Wako, Saitama
(All signed on August 27, 2004)

Notable people from Tōkamachi
 Toshiei Mizuochi, Japanese politician
 Shuichi Shigeno, Japanese mangaka
 Kōji Takahashi, Japanese actor
 Genichi Taguchi, Japanese engineer and statistician
 Maki Miyamae, Japanese pop singer, professional chef and restaurateur

Local attractions
 Tōkamachi also hosts the Echigo-Tsumari Art Triennial
 
 Kiyotsu Gorge

References

External links

 Tokamachi City Government 
 Official English Site 
 Official Tourism Site 
 Tokamachi Tourist Association Official Website 

Cities in Niigata Prefecture
Tōkamachi, Niigata